Benny Golson and the Philadelphians is an album by saxophonist Benny Golson which was recorded in November and December 1958. Originally released on the United Artists label, the album was re-issued in 1998 on the Blue Note label with four additional bonus tracks.

Reception

Scott Yanow, in his review for AllMusic, says the album is "recommended for hard bop collectors".

Track listing
All compositions by Benny Golson except as indicated
 "You're Not the Kind" (Gigi Gryce) – 4:17   
 "Blues on My Mind" – 7:27   
 "Stablemates" – 5:44   
 "Thursday's Theme" – 7:35   
 "Afternoon in Paris" (John Lewis) – 6:50   
 "Calgary" (Ray Bryant) – 3:36   
 "Blues March" – 4:02 Bonus track on CD reissue   
 "I Remember Clifford" – 2:59 Bonus track on CD reissue     
 "Moanin'" (Bobby Timmons) – 6:04 Bonus track on CD reissue     
 "Stablemates" [2nd Version] – 8:07 Bonus track on CD reissue

Personnel
Benny Golson – tenor saxophone
Lee Morgan – trumpet  
Ray Bryant — piano
Percy Heath – bass
Philly Joe Jones – drums

Bonus tracks recorded in Paris, France, on December 12, 1958
Roger Guérin – trumpet
Benny Golson – tenor saxophone
Bobby Timmons – piano
Pierre Michelot – bass
Christian Garros – drums

References 

1958 albums
United Artists Records albums
Benny Golson albums